Liam Tribe-Simmons (born July, 1983) is an Australian head men's basketball coach at Colorado Christian University.

Early life
Simmons was born in Australia. His parents divorced after having four children. His mother, Julie, subsequently married David Simmons, an American ex-patriate professional basketball player who played in the Australian NBL for 14 years.  They had two children, Olivia and Ben Simmons, a player in the NBA. In Australia Liam Simmons played for several teams, including the Newcastle Hunters U23 team and New South Wales U20 team. He graduated from San Diego Christian College in 2007 with a degree in kinesiology  and obtained a master's degree  in education  from Australian Catholic University in 2008. He played as a guard for three years at San Diego Christian and was a member of their NCCAA championship team.

Coaching career
He began his coaching career as an assistant with Newcastle, working with the U18 and U14 teams in 2006 and 2007. After graduation he returned to the United States in 2009, coaching at Northwest Christian School in Phoenix, Arizona for three years, the last as head coach.  His first college coaching job was in 2013 for one year as an assistant at Nicholls State University; this was followed by four years at Southwest Baptist University, where he became assistant head coach for the 2017–2018 season. In 2018 joined U.C. Riverside for a few months as an assistant coach. He gave it up to work with his brother Ben full-time to improve his foul shooting and jump shot. This was a situation not without controversy. The team had chosen coach John Townsend to work with Simmons. Simmons' choice of his brother has been described as puzzling; the team was reported to be "utterly disappointed" that he decided to go in that direction. He returned to Down Under and the coaching ranks in early 2020, signing as head coach of the Franklin Bulls of the New Zealand NBL. COVID-19 restrictions ensued shortly after his signing and put the 2020 season in doubt. With no clear starting date for a shortened season, the Bulls released Simmons from his contract. In May, 2020, he was signed to coach the men's Colorado Christian University basketball team.  In his first season as coach, the D2 Colorado Christian Cougars had a record of 4-14.

References

Australian men's basketball coaches
Australian men's basketball players
Colorado Christian University
San Diego Christian College alumni
Australian Catholic University alumni
Living people
1983 births
People from Phoenix, Arizona
Australian expatriate basketball people in the United States
Australian expatriate basketball people in New Zealand